WTCB (106.7 MHz) is a commercial FM radio station licensed to Orangeburg, South Carolina, and serving the Columbia metropolitan area. The station, known as "B106.7," is owned by Cumulus Media and airs an adult contemporary radio format.  For much of November and December, it switches to all-Christmas music.  The studios and offices are located on Gervais Street in Downtown Columbia.

WTCB has an effective radiated power of 100,000 watts, the highest permitted for non-grandfathered FM stations.  The transmitter is off Indian Trail in Swansea, near the Congaree National Park.

History

WDIX-FM and WPJS
On July 6, 1967, the station signed on as WDIX-FM, the sister station to WDIX (AM 1150) in Orangeburg (formerly WRNO, now off the air). The station was known as "W-107" and was owned by Frank Best. At the time, the station featured an automated format with music that would be considered today as Hot Adult Contemporary.

In late 1976, both stations were sold to Radio Smiles, a group owned by Norman Suttles. WDIX changed to Top 40, while WDIX-FM became religious WPJS.  The call sign stood for We Proclaim Jesus Saves.  In 1978, the transmitting power was increased from 37,000 to 100,000 watts, utilizing a new CCA transmitter and 10-bay Shively antenna tower.

Country WIGL
In 1982, WDIX and WPJS were sold to the Keymarket Group.  WPJS became country music WIGL, calling itself "Wiggle 106."  It used a format from TM's (now Jones TM) "3-In-A-Row" Modern Country music service, operating it live-assisted.  WIGL made an effort to serve the larger, more lucrative Columbia radio market, but was plagued with periodical audio problems as well as fierce competition from established country station WCOS-FM.  In 1984, Suburban Radio Group of Concord, North Carolina, bought WDIX, and in 1985, the company bought WORG.

In early 1985, WIGL took the first steps toward improving its coverage of Columbia by building a new 714 foot tower in Sandy Run and moving the studios to the Granby Building in Cayce. It was rumored that WIGL would remain country and challenge Columbia's longtime country powerhouse, WCOS-FM. That rumor proved false.

Switch to AC
On April 15, 1985, the station signed on from its new tower as an Adult Contemporary/CHR/Oldies hybrid with the new call letters WTCB and a new moniker, "B106." WTCB quickly improved its ratings, with a more contemporary format and a signal that covered two-thirds of South Carolina. WTCB provides at least secondary coverage from the southern suburbs of Charlotte to the northern suburbs of Charleston.

By the late 1980s, due to changing market conditions, "B106" softened its music by dropping the more upbeat titles and focused on being a soft adult contemporary outlet. At that time, the market had two other AC outlets, WSCQ and new upstart WAAS (now WARQ), fighting for Columbia's AC audience. By the end of 1992, both stations flipped to different formats, leaving WTCB as the only AC remaining in the market. Bloomington Broadcasting purchased the station in 1989 from Keymarket Communications for $4.34 million.  Bill McElveen was the General Manager until Cumulus Media purchased the station in late 2011.

Beginning in 1993, "B106" gradually reverted toward a more upbeat gold-based AC format. With the increasing use of digital tuners on radios, the station updated its on-air moniker as "B106.7."

Gamecocks football
From September 2002 until November 2007, WTCB was the flagship radio station for University of South Carolina Gamecocks football, taking over from longtime outlet WVOC. WTCB devoted a significant number of hours to pre-game and post-game coverage on Saturdays when the team played its games. When Citadel Broadcasting moved co-owned WNKT from the Charleston radio market to Columbia, it switched that station to an all sports format. Citadel merged with Cumulus Media on September 16, 2011.

Format adjustments
On July 15, 2013, WTCB shifted its format to hot adult contemporary. With the change by sister station WOMG from classic hits to country music in 2014, WTCB added some 1980s music to its playlist.  In 2015, WTCB moved to new studio in downtown Columbia, across from the State Capital in The Tower building currently anchored by the Bank of America.  The air staff during this time included afternoon host Steve McKay and midday personality Summer aka Summer James who moved from being Los Angeles based back to South Carolina. Notably, Summer who made the biggest jump from Small market to Los Angeles previously also broke a record upon returning winning SCBA Radio Personality of the Year in 2019 after being back on the air for less than 5 months. Featured in Multiple magazines for her Author work she left B voted as the Lake Murray Lifestyle Magazines Radio Personality of the year for 2023. syndicated "Bob & Sheri" from Charlotte was heard in morning drive time

WTCB shifted to a mainstream adult contemporary format playing current and past AC artists being inclusive of a younger demo. WTCB began the practice of playing all Christmas music from Thanksgiving week until Christmas Day during that time. This above named group can no longer B heard on WTCB

References

External links
B106.7 official website

TCB
Cumulus Media radio stations
Mainstream adult contemporary radio stations in the United States
Radio stations established in 1967